The women's 52 kg competition in judo at the 2018 Mediterranean Games was held on 27 June at the Cambrils Pavilion in Cambrils.

Schedule
All times are Central European Summer Time (UTC+2).

Results

Main Round

Repechage

References

External links
 

W52
2018
Mediterranean W52